Ahalya is a 2004 Indian Tamil soap opera that aired on Sun TV. The show premiered on 26 April 2004 and aired Monday through Friday at 11:30AM IST. The show stars Manjari, Shyam Ganesh / Sakthi Kumar, Abser, Dhivyadharshini, Snegha, Sindhu, Shanmugasundari, Lakshmi Priya and Sanjeev. After the show ended the slot has followed by Bhandham of same banner

Plot
The story of pure friendship between a young man and woman. (Manjari) plays Ahalya, while (Abser) acts as her friend, Siva. Ahalya marries Siva's brother Kadhir (Shyam Ganesh) and sincerely wishes to be a loving wife, a dutiful daughter-in-law and a true friend of Siva. But problems arise because her friendship is misunderstood by every one in the family. The problems and the final solution are what "Ahalya" is all about.

Cast

Main

 Manjari Vinodhini as Ahalya / Manasa
 Shyam Ganesh (1-135) / Sakthi Kumar (136-616) as Kathir
 Abser as Shiva
 Dinky as Mahalakshmi

Recurring

 Oorvambu Lakshmi as Amutha
 Sanjeev
 Dhivyadharshini (Episode: 01-312) / Preethi Sanjeev as Gowri (Episode: 312-616)
 Nesan
 Srikala
 Shreekumar as Hot 
 Snegha
 Kowshik
 Sindhu
 Shanmugasundari
 Lakshmi Priya
 A.P. Nallamuthu
 Rajasekhar
 A.L. Raghavan
 Sathyajit
 Gowthami
 Latha Rao 
 Ramachandran
 Roopa Sree as Gayathiri
 Sathya
 Saakshi Siva
 Shobhana
 Amarasigamani
 S. Sai Prasad
 S.V. Devan
 Annapoorni
 Sasi
 Prabhakar
 Comedy P.S.Kicha
 Vani
 Krishnan
 S.N Parvathy
 Mali
 Vaman Malini
 Amirthakadesan
 Master Prabhu 
 Baby Rooba Shri
 Maya Prakash
 Ramesh Kumar
 T.Rajeswari
 J.Lalitha
 Vincent Roy
 Illancheran
 Vishnu nath
 M.A. Thangaraj
 Dhanush
 Stepan Raj
 Jaya Prakash
 Dr. Shreethar
 Rajagopalan
 Ashok
 Premi
 T.T.Ramanujam
 Bombay Kannan
 Bharath
 Prem
 Vaithiyanadhan
 Vijayalakshmi
 Baba Kennedy

Title track
The title track was composed by D. Imman and was sung by Unnikrishnan. The lyrics for the title track were written by Vairamuthu.

References

External links
 

Sun TV original programming
Television shows set in Tamil Nadu
Tamil-language melodrama television series
2004 Tamil-language television series debuts
Tamil-language television shows
2006 Tamil-language television series endings